The Old Colony History Museum (OCHM) is located at 66 Church Green in Taunton, Bristol County, Massachusetts, United States.
Since 1926, the museum has occupied the historic former Bristol Academy school building. The building was designed in 1852 by Richard Upjohn, architect of New York City's Trinity Church, and is listed on the National Register of Historic Places as part of the Church Green Historic District. The museum was previously located in the former Union Mission Chapel on Cedar Street.

The Old Colony History Museum is home to an extensive collection of regional objects and archives and a research library specializing in local history and genealogy. Its parent organization, the Old Colony Historical Society, was founded on May 4, 1853, making it one of New England's oldest historical societies.

The organization maintains a research library specializing in the genealogy of Southeastern Massachusetts and local history, a museum of objects associated with the history of the Taunton area and educational programs which are open to the public.

See also
First Parish Church (Taunton, Massachusetts)
Taunton City Hall
National Register of Historic Places listings in Taunton, Massachusetts
Plymouth Colony

References

External links
 Old Colony History Museum (OCHM)'s website
 THE NEW OLD COLONY: Taunton's history museum gets a reboot
 44 Things: Displays at Old Colony History Museum offer a trip back in time

Taunton, Massachusetts
Richard Upjohn buildings
Historical societies in Massachusetts
History museums in Massachusetts
Museums in Bristol County, Massachusetts
Italianate architecture in Massachusetts
School buildings completed in 1852
Historic district contributing properties in Massachusetts
National Register of Historic Places in Taunton, Massachusetts
1852 establishments in Massachusetts